{{DISPLAYTITLE:C18H17NO3}}
The molecular formula C18H17NO3 (molar mass: 295.33 g/mol, exact mass: 295.1208 u) may refer to:

 Indobufen
 Oliveroline
 Pukateine
 Xylopine

Molecular formulas